Vacanze ai Caraibi is a 2015 Italian comedy film directed by Neri Parenti.

Cast
Christian De Sica as Mario Grossi Tubi
Massimo Ghini as Ottavio Vianale
Angela Finocchiaro as Gianna
Dario Bandiera as Adriano Fiore
Ilaria Spada as Claudia
Luca Argentero as Fausto
Maria Luisa De Crescenzo as Anna Pia
Cristina Marino as Maria Claudia
Francisco Cruz as the butler

See also
 List of Christmas films

References

External links

2015 films
Films directed by Neri Parenti
Films scored by Bruno Zambrini
2010s Italian-language films
2015 comedy films
2010s Christmas comedy films
Italian Christmas comedy films
2010s Italian films